Meigenielloides is a genus of flies in the family Tachinidae.

Species
Meigenielloides cinerea Townsend, 1919

Distribution
Mexico.

References

Diptera of North America
Exoristinae
Tachinidae genera
Taxa named by Charles Henry Tyler Townsend
Monotypic Brachycera genera